Birthright is the concept of things being due to a person upon or by fact of their birth, or due to the order of their birth.

Birthright may also refer to:

Film and television
 Birthright (1924 film), a silent film by Oscar Micheaux 
 Birthright (1939 film), a sound remake of the 1924 film also by Oscar Micheaux 
 Birthright (2010 film), a Japanese horror film
 Birthrights (TV series), a 1991–1993 BBC2 TV series
 "Birthright" (The Outer Limits), a 1995 episode of The Outer Limits
 "Birthright" (Star Trek: The Next Generation), a 1993 episode of Star Trek: The Next Generation
 "Birthright" (Stargate SG-1), an episode of Stargate SG-1

Literature 
 Birthright: The Book of Man, a 1982 science fiction novel by Mike Resnick
 Birthright (Robinson novel), a 1993 Doctor Who novel
 Birthrights (play), a 2003 play by David Williamson
 Birthright (Diablo novel), a 2006 novel by Richard A. Knaak
 Birthright, a 1975 novel by Kathleen Sky
 Birthright, a 1922 novel by Thomas Sigismund Stribling

Comics
 Birthright (comic book), a 2014 comic book series by Joshua Williamson, Andrei Bressan, and Adriano Lucas
 Superman: Birthright, a 2003 comic book series by Mark Waid and Leinil Francis Yu

Music 
 Le droit d'aînesse or The Birthright, an opéra bouffe that premiered in 1883
 Birthright (album), a 2005 album by James Blood Ulmer
 "Birthright" (A-ha song) (2005)
 "Birthright" (Samhain song)
 "Birthright", a 2012 song by Celldweller from Wish Upon a Blackstar

Other uses
 Birthright, Texas, an unincorporated community
 Birthright (campaign setting), a setting for Dungeons & Dragons
 Birthright: The Gorgon's Alliance, a 1996 video game based on Dungeons & Dragons
 Birthright International, an organization of crisis pregnancy centers
 Birthright Israel, a program offering free trips to Israel for young Jews
 Birthright Unplugged, a program set up in response to Birthright Israel
 Birthright, Inc., an American eugenics organization

See also
 Jus soli, the right of anyone born in the territory of a state to nationality or citizenship
 Birthright citizenship in the United States